El Sahel Bahari is a village in the Sohag Governorate, Egypt.

References 

Populated places in Sohag Governorate